121P/Shoemaker–Holt, also known as Shoemaker-Holt 2, is a periodic comet in the Solar System.

References

External links 
 Orbital simulation from JPL (Java) / Horizons Ephemeris
 121P/Shoemaker-Holt 2 – Seiichi Yoshida @ aerith.net
121P at Kronk's Cometography

Periodic comets
0121
121P
121P
121P
Comets in 2013
19890309